Love 101 is a 2000 comedy film that was directed by Adrian Fulle. The movie first released to theaters on February 14, 2000 and stars Michael Muhney and Jeff Anderson as two college students that find their friendship threatened by the introduction of a new girl.

Cast
 Michael Mulhaney as Andrew
 Mary Kay Cook as Shayna
 Joe Collins as Joe
 Jimmy Slonina as Tad
 Heidi Mokryci as Elke
 Jeff Anderson as Phil
 Will Carpenter as Steve
 Kim Wade as Jean
 Tiffany Paulsen as Liz
 Brad Nelson as Tom
 Gary Houston as Professor
 Monica Payne as Martha
 Amy Ludwig as Physics Professor
 Dan Bigley as Eduardo’s Host

Synopsis 
Over Thanksgiving break, while his roommate is away from campus, pretty boy Andrew (Michael Muhney) sleeps with Shayna (Mary Kay Cook), his roommate Joe's (Jim Slonina) dream girl. When Shayna starts a relationship with Joe, attempting to make Andrew jealous, it causes a rift in the boys' friendship.

Reception
The A.V. Club panned Love 101 and commented that it was "paced like a cement mixer, and while the actors move through the paces of some tired gags between moments of self-reflection, you might find yourself studying the wall decorations." Scott Weinberg of eFilmCritic.com also criticized the film as they felt that it got "Points for trying, but this flick gets its inspirations from movies not all that hot to begin with, and then simply rehashes them point by point." The Daily Herald gave a more positive review, stating that "What "Love 101" and its virtual all-Chicagoland cast lack in polish, they make up for with a generous supply of sincerity."

References

External links 
 
 

Films directed by Adrian Fulle